Thy Phu is a Canadian author and academic who is a distinguished professor of race, diaspora and visual justice at the University of Toronto.

Education 
Phu has a master's degree in English from McMaster University, and a PhD from the University of California Berkeley.

She undertook a postdoctoral fellowship at the University of Toronto.

Career 
Phu is a professor of media studies at the University of Toronto Scarborough, where she is also a distinguished professor of race, diaspora and visual justice.

She was previously faculty at Western University and taught at the National University of Singapore as well as Yale University.

She is the director of The Family Camera Network, a research project that supports local communities to create antiracist public archive photography. She co-founded the Critical Refugee Studies Network of Canada, and she is a co-editor of Trans Asia Photography journal.

She is an elected member of the Royal Society of Canada's College of New Scholars, Artists, and Scientists.

Selected publications 
She has written and co-edited four books:

 Picturing Model Citizens: Civility in Asian American Visual Culture, 2011, Temple University Press  (author)
 Feeling Photography, 2014, Duke University Press  (edited)
 Refugee States: Critical Refugee Studies in Canada, 2021, University of Toronto Press   (edited)
 Warring Visions: Vietnam and Photography, 2022, Duke University Press  (author)

References

External links 

 Official website

Living people
McMaster University alumni
Academic staff of the University of Toronto
21st-century Canadian writers
21st-century Canadian women writers
University of California, Berkeley alumni
Year of birth missing (living people)